Lkhamjavyn Dekhlee (born 20 August 1937) is a Mongolian former sports shooter. He competed in the 300 metre rifle event at the 1964 Summer Olympics.

References

External links
 

1937 births
Living people
Mongolian male sport shooters
Olympic shooters of Mongolia
Shooters at the 1964 Summer Olympics
Place of birth missing (living people)
20th-century Mongolian people